WASP-25 is a yellow main sequence star in the constellation of Hydra.

Star characteristics 
WASP-25 is slightly metal-poor (85% of Solar amount) and is probably a young star which has just entered the main sequence.

Planetary system 
The "Hot Jupiter" class planet WASP-25b was discovered around WASP-25 in 2010. The planet would have an equilibrium temperature of 1212 K.
A Rossiter-McLaughlin effect based study in 2011 found a modest misalignment of the planetary orbit to the rotational axis of the parent star, equal to 14.6 degrees. A habitability study in 2018 found WASP-25b does not adversely affect the stability of planetary orbits in the habitable zone of WASP-25.

References 

Planetary systems with one confirmed planet
Hydra (constellation)
G-type main-sequence stars
Planetary transit variables
25
J13012637-2731199